Birla Balika Vidyapeeth is an English medium residential public school for girls, located in Pilani, Jhunjhunu, Rajasthan, India. The school was founded in 1941. It started with 25 girls and now has 900 students. It is affiliated with the  CBSE.

The school band has been a part of the RDC Parade at New Delhi which is led by Mr.Rajumar since India became a republic in 1950.

Memberships
Birla Balika Vidyapeeth is a member school of:
 Indian Public Schools' Conference,
 United Schools Organisation,
 Society for Unaided Private Schools of Rajasthan,
 National Progressive Schools' Conference.

Activities

Fine Arts Department
The Fine Arts Department trains students in dance, music, painting and crafts.

Guidance and Counseling
The Counseling Cell has a Psychologist and a Counselor. They solve problems like adjusting to the new environment for new students, coping with studies, personal problems, and developing study habits. Career counseling is provided by counselors from professional agencies.

National Cadet Corps
Each year the school NCC troop goes to an ATC Camp where the students are given training as an army cadet, an adventure camp gives them exposure to adventurous activities like parasailing, mountaineering, bouldering, and rock climbing.

The school has two troops under 1 RAJ CTR Jr. wing with 150 cadets and one troop under 1 RAJ CTR Sr. wing with 52 cadets taken care of by three ANOs.

School Band
The NCC Band has participated in the Republic Day parade at New Delhi for the past 78 consecutive years.

Sports and games
 The school has playing fields and a gymnasium. 
 The students play sports and games like football, basketball, volleyball, tennis, badminton, roller skating, skating, table tennis, kho kho, hockey, and athletics. 
 A gymnasium and a swimming pool are available. 
 Horse riding is taught by expert coaches. 
 The school provides yoga and judo.

Alumni 
Chandrawati (Former Lt. Governor Puducherry,  Dr. Suneetha Mittal(Director & HOD Fortis Memorial Research Institute Gurugram, Ms. Pawan Surana (Former Head of Rajasthan University Women's Association Jaipur), Dr. Malti Goel (Former Advisor DST & CSIR Emeritus Scientist, Ministry of Science and Technology, Govt. of India), Mrs. Kritika Kulhari (IAS), Mrs. Pratiksha Godara (IPS), Mrs. Anita Gopalan (Heim, PEN America Awardee), Shakti Mohan (Bollywood Celebrity), Neeti Mohan (Bollywood Celebrity), Mukti Mohan (Bollywood Celebrity)

Clubs 
  Science Club
  Eco Club
  Mathematics Club
  Literary Club (Hindi and English)
  Health and Wellness Club
  Creativity Club
  Social Science Club
. Civil Services Club
. Robotics Club
.
.
.
.
.
.
.

SUPW 
For Socially Useful Public Work the students have adopted nearby villages and through slogans, processions, Nukkad Nataks, posters and collages they spread awareness regarding social issues like dignity of labour, women empowerment, youth empowerment, self employment generation, female foeticide, child labour, and drug abuse.

School websites  
 bbvpilani.edu.in

 Birla Balika Vidyapeeth reference in India Today list of top 10 boarding schools

References

Schools in Rajasthan
Boarding schools in Rajasthan
Girls' schools in Rajasthan
Education in Jhunjhunu district
Educational institutions established in 1941
1941 establishments in India
Round Square schools